Richard Emanuel Moray Martinez (born February 24, 1977) is a Paraguayan professional boxer.

Professional boxing career
On July 5, 2019, while still in prison for aggravated robbery, Moray defeated Brazilian Carlos Santos de Jesus in the second round via knockout. The Brazil-based National and International Boxing Association, which sanctioned the fight, declared Moray the super welterweight champion of South America. The fight was featured on the first episode of the fourth season of the Netflix television documentary Inside the World's Toughest Prisons that was released on July 29, 2020.

Personal life
On July 11, 2019, Moray was granted parole, a week after defeating Carlos Santos de Jesus. In October 2020, Moray was arrested for alleged assault and theft. His parole was revoked by Judge Cynthia Lovera and he was sent back to prison in Tacumbú.

Professional boxing record

References

1987 births
Living people
Paraguayan boxers
Paraguayan male boxers
Sportspeople convicted of crimes
Welterweight boxers
Paraguayan sportspeople